Dronfield is a civil parish in the North East Derbyshire district of Derbyshire, England.  The parish contains 44 listed buildings that are recorded in the National Heritage List for England.  Of these, one is listed at Grade I, the highest of the three grades, four are at Grade II*, the middle grade, and the others are at Grade II, the lowest grade.  The parish contains the town of Dronfield, the district of Dronfield Woodhouse, the village of Coal Aston, and the surrounding area.  Most of the listed buildings are houses, cottages and associated structures, farmhouses and farm buildings.  The other listed buildings include churches, a churchyard cross, public houses, a former school, a milestone, a monument, and a bridge.


Key

Buildings

References

Citations

Sources

vale

 

Dronfield
 
Dronfield